Princess Teresa Czartoryska (13 July 1785 - 31 December 1868) was a Polish noblewoman. She was a daughter of Józef Klemens Czartoryski and Dorota Barbara Jabłonowska.

She married Prince Henryk Ludwik Lubomirski (1777–1850) on 24 May 1807.

Her daughter Jadwiga Lubomirska married Eugène, 8th Prince of Ligne in Vienna on 28 October 1836.

Ancestors

References 

1852 deaths
Teresa
1780 births